Cottle County is a county in the U.S. state of Texas. As of the 2020 census, its population was 1,380. Its county seat is Paducah. The county was founded in 1876 and later organized in 1892. It is named for George Washington Cottle, who died defending the Alamo. Cottle County was formerly one of 46 prohibition, or entirely dry counties in the state of Texas. It now allows beer and wine sales.

The Matador Ranch, based in neighboring Motley County, once reached into Cottle County.

Geography

Major highways
  U.S. Highway 62
  U.S. Highway 70
  U.S. Highway 83

Adjacent counties
 Childress County (north)
 Hardeman County (northeast)
 Foard County (east)
 King County (south)
 Dickens County (southwest)
 Motley County (west)
 Hall County (northwest)

Demographics

Note: the US Census treats Hispanic/Latino as an ethnic category. This table excludes Latinos from the racial categories and assigns them to a separate category. Hispanics/Latinos can be of any race.

As of the census of 2000,  1,904 people, 820 households, and 550 families resided in the county.  The population density was 2 people/sq mi (1/km2).  The 1,088 housing units averaged 1/sq mi (0/km2).  The racial makeup of the county was 81.46% White, 9.87% African American, 7.20% from other races, and 1.47% from two or more races.  About 18.91% of the population was Hispanic or Latino of any race.

Of the 820 households, 28.00% had children under  18 living with them, 53.90% were married couples living together, 10.60% had a female householder with no husband present, and 32.90% were not families. Around 32.00% of all households were made up of individuals, and 20.90% had someone living alone who was 65  or older.  The average household size was 2.28, and the average family size was 2.84.

In the county, the age distribution was 23.90% under 18, 5.70% from 18 to 24, 21.50% from 25 to 44, 23.30% from 45 to 64, and 25.60% who were 65 or older.  The median age was 44 years. For every 100 females, there were 87.20 males.  For every 100 females age 18 and over, there were 81.90 males.

The median income for a household in the county was $25,446, and for a family was $33,036. Males had a median income of $24,375 versus $16,667 for females. The per capita income for the county was $16,212.  About 13.70% of families and 18.40% of the population were below the poverty line, including 28.40% of those under age 18 and 16.00% of those age 65 or over.

Politics
Until 2000, Cottle County went consistently Democratic in presidential elections, except for the 1928 election, when sentiment against Al Smith’s devout Catholic faith and opposition to Prohibition allowed Herbert Hoover to carry the county with 51% of the vote. After John F. Kennedy, Lyndon Johnson, and Hubert Humphrey easily carried the county in 1960, 1964, and 1968, respectively, Cottle County again voted for the Democratic candidate in the 1972 election, as it was the only county in Texas north of Maverick County (Eagle Pass) to have been won by George McGovern, albeit by a margin of only seven votes. After Jimmy Carter carried it in 1976 and 1980, Walter Mondale won a majority of the county's votes in 1984, Michael Dukakis won the county in 1988 and Bill Clinton carried it in 1992 and 1996.

Like the rest of the Bible Belt, Cottle has trended powerfully Republican and in the last six elections, the Republican nominee has won more than two-thirds of the vote. In 2012, Mitt Romney received 555 votes to Barack Obama’s 180, and in 2016, Hillary Clinton won fewer than 100 votes in the county, less than a tenth as many as Jimmy Carter 40 years before.

Communities
 Cee Vee
 Narcisso
 Paducah (county seat)

Education
School districts serving sections of the county include:
 Childress Independent School District
 Paducah Independent School District
 Quanah Independent School District

The county is in the service area of Vernon College.

See also

 National Register of Historic Places listings in Cottle County, Texas
 Recorded Texas Historic Landmarks in Cottle County

References

External links

 Cottle County government's website
 Cottle County in Handbook of Texas Online at the University of Texas
 Cottle County Profile from the Texas Association of Counties 
 Paducah ISD -- Home of the Dragons!
 Cottle, George Washington (1811-1836)
 The TXGenWeb Project: Cottle County
 Historical Marker -- Cottle County Courthouse
 Historical Marker -- Cottle County
 Historical Marker -- Cottle County
 Historical Marker -- The Grey and the Blue

 
1892 establishments in Texas
Populated places established in 1892